Burrell is a surname. Notable people with the surname include:
 Anne Burrell (born 1969), American celebrity chef
 Bill Burrell (died 1998), American football player
 Boz Burrell (1946–2006), English musician
 Charles Burrell (disambiguation), multiple people
 Daisy Burrell (1892–1982), English actress
 Dave Burrell (born 1940), American jazz instrumentalist
 David Burrell (born 1933), American Roman Catholic priest and theologian 
 David H. Burrell (1841–1919), American industrialist, inventor, and philanthropist
 Dawn Burrell (born 1973), American long jumper
Ellen Burrell (1850-1938), American mathematics professor
 Ervin Burrell, character from the TV show The Wire
 Ezra A. Burrell (1867–1922), Republican politician from Idaho
 Gary Burrell (1937–2019), American businessman
 Gibson Burrell (born 1948), British organizational theorist and professor 
 Henry Burrell, (1873–1945) Australian naturalist
 Sir Henry Burrell (1904–1988), Royal Australian Navy admiral
 Isaac D. Burrell (1865-1914), noted African-American physician
 Jeremiah Burrell (1815–1856), American lawyer and judge
 John Burrell (disambiguation), multiple people
 Kenny Burrell (born 1931), American jazz guitarist
 Kim Burrell (born 1972), American gospel singer
 Leroy Burrell (born 1967), American track and field athlete
 Louie Burrell (1873–1971), English artist
 Luther Burrell (born 1987), English rugby union player
 Martin Burrell (1858–1938), Canadian politician
 Ode Burrell (born 1939), American football player
 Orville Richard Burrell (born 1968), better known as Shaggy, Jamaican-American reggae musician
 Parker Burrell (born 1939), politician in Manitoba, Canada
 Pat Burrell (born 1976), American baseball player
 Paul Burrell (born 1958), butler to Diana, Princess of Wales
 Percy Jewett Burrell (1877–1964), American author and director of historical and civic pageants
 Peter Drummond-Burrell, 22nd Baron Willoughby de Eresby (1782–1865), English nobleman
 Philip "Fatis" Burrell (1954–2011), Jamaican record producer
 Prudence Burns Burrell (1916 - 2012), African American nurse
 Richard Burrell, British television producer
 Richard Burrell (swimmer) (born 1959), British swimmer
 Roy A. Burrell (born 1952), American politician
 Sandy Burrell (born 1955), Scottish football player
 Scott Burrell (born 1971), American basketball player
 Stanley Kirk Burrell, or his stage name MC Hammer (born 1962), American rapper
 Tom Burrell, (born 1939), advertising agency founder and chairman emeritus
 Ty Burrell (born 1967), American actor
 William Burrell (1861–1958), Scottish shipping magnate and art collector

Surnames